The 2022 Nova Scotia New Democratic Party leadership election took place on June 25, 2022 to elect a leader to replace Gary Burrill, who announced his intention to resign on November 9, 2021 after leading the party since 2016 and following the party's defeat in the 2021 Nova Scotia general election.

As the only candidate in the race by the May 21, 2022 deadline, Dartmouth South MLA Claudia Chender was expected to be chosen as leader. At the party convention in Dartmouth on June 25, 2022, Chender was approved by party members and elected as leader.

Background
Gary Burrill announced that he would resign as leader on November 9, 2021, following the party's defeat in the 2021 general election. Burrill remained as acting leader of the Nova Scotia New Democratic Party until his successor was chosen.

Timeline

2021
November 9 – Gary Burrill announces his resignation as leader of the Nova Scotia New Democratic Party.

2022
January 29 – The party unveils the base set of rules for the election.
February 14 – Claudia Chender declares her candidacy
May 21 – Deadline for candidates to submit nomination.
May 30 – Last day to become an eligible party member.
June 25 – Leadership convention is held in Dartmouth.

Candidates

Claudia Chender 
Claudia Chender is the MLA for Dartmouth South, having served since 2017. Prior to announcing her candidacy, Chender served as NDP House Leader and Caucus Spokesperson for Economic Development, Justice, Status of Women, Natural Resources & Renewables, and Fisheries & Aquaculture. Chender is also a lawyer and has worked in both the not-for-profit and private sectors.

Candidacy announced: February 14, 2022
Campaign website:

Declined
Kendra Coombes, MLA for Cape Breton Centre-Whitney Pier (2020-).
Suzy Hansen, MLA for Halifax Needham (2021-).
Lisa Lachance, MLA for Halifax Citadel-Sable Island (2021-); Deputy Speaker of the Nova Scotia House of Assembly (2021-). (Endorsed Chender)
Susan Leblanc, MLA for Dartmouth North (2017-). (Endorsed Chender)

References

Liberal
2022 elections in Canada
2022 political party leadership elections
Liberal Party leadership election